Symphony No. 1 in C major may refer to:

 Symphony No. 1 (Balakirev)
 Symphony No. 1 (Beethoven)
 Symphony No. 1 (Michael Haydn)

See also
 Symphony in C (Bizet)
 Symphony in C (Dukas)
 Symphony in C major (Wagner)